Bharat lake or Bharat tal (Nepali: भरत ताल) is the second largest man made lake in Nepal. It is located in Madhesh Province of Sarlahi District. It covers an area of more than 50 bighas or 35 hectares, and is 35 feet deep. It has become a tourist attraction after motorboat and jet boat rides were introduced in 2021.

The lake was named after Bharat Kumar Thapa, a mayor of Bagmati Municipality.

References 

Artificial lakes of Nepal
Lakes of Bagmati Province